Digita biuncus is a moth of the family Erebidae first described by Michael Fibiger in 2008. It is known from Taiwan.

Adults have been found in April, August and September. There are probably two generations per year.

The crosslines are all present. The antemedial, postmedial and terminal lines are prominent, black and slightly waved. The terminal line is marked by tight black interveinal spots. The hindwing is blackish brown, without a discal spot.

References

Micronoctuini
Taxa named by Michael Fibiger
Moths described in 2008